Cape Verde is an island country in West Africa.

Cape Verde can also refer to:

 Cap-Vert, the peninsula from which the country takes its name
 Portuguese Cape Verde, the predecessor to Cape Verde
 Cap-Vert (volcano), a volcano on the peninsula
 Cape Verde (Mars), a surface feature on Mars
 Cape Verde hurricane, a type of weather system
 Cape Verde, a code name for AMD's Radeon HD 7700 series of graphics cards

See also
 Cape Green, an ice cliff on the Antarctic Peninsula
 Cabo Verde (disambiguation)